Charles Gabriel Kurland (born 14 January 1936) is an American-born Swedish biochemist.

Kurland earned a doctorate in 1961 at Harvard University, advised by James D. Watson. Kurland accepted a postdoctoral research position at the Microbiology Institute of the University of Copenhagen, then joined the Uppsala University faculty in 1971. He retired from Uppsala in 2001, and was granted emeritus status. He was later affiliated with Lund University.

Kurland was elected to the Royal Swedish Academy of Sciences in 1988 as a foreign member, and reclassified as a Swedish member in 2002. The Estonian Academy of Sciences recognized his achievements in biochemistry, and awarded Kurland an equivalent honor in 1991.

References

1936 births
Living people
21st-century Swedish scientists
20th-century Swedish scientists
Members of the Royal Swedish Academy of Sciences
Members of the Estonian Academy of Sciences
Academic staff of Uppsala University
Harvard University alumni
Academic staff of Lund University
American emigrants to Sweden
Swedish biochemists
20th-century American biochemists
21st-century American biochemists
Members of the Royal Society of Sciences in Uppsala